Mahika Gaur (born 9 March 2006) is an English-born cricketer who plays for the United Arab Emirates women's cricket team and the Manchester Originals. She plays as a left-arm medium bowler. She made her Twenty20 International debut against Indonesia at the age of 12.

Domestic career
Gaur holds a UK passport, allowing her to play cricket in England as a local player. In July 2022, Gaur was signed by Manchester Originals for the 2022 season of The Hundred. Prior to playing in the Hundred, she appeared for the North West Thunder Academy side, and took 3/25 in a match against the Northern Diamonds Academy on 23 July 2022.

International career
Gaur first played for the United Arab Emirates aged 12, appearing in the 2019 Thailand Women's T20 Smash. After playing a match against Thailand A on 12 January, she made her Women's Twenty20 International (WT20I) debut on 19 January 2019, against Indonesia. She went on to play for the UAE at the 2019 ICC Women's Qualifier Asia, the 2021 ICC Women's T20 World Cup Asia Qualifier, the 2022 GCC Women's Gulf Cup and the side's series against Hong Kong. At the ICC Under-19 Women's T20 World Cup Asia Qualifier, Gaur took 5/2 from four overs to help bowl out Nepal for 8. Gaur ended the tournament, which was won by the UAE, as the second-highest wicket-taker, with 11 wickets at an average of 2.36.  In October 2022, she played in the Women's Asia Cup, and was the UAE's leading wicket-taker, with six wickets at an average of 19.83.

In December 2022, Gaur was named in the United Arab Emirates squad for the 2023 ICC Under-19 Women's T20 World Cup. She scored 79 runs and took two wickets in the tournament.

References

External links
 
 

2006 births
Living people
Sportspeople from Reading, Berkshire
English women cricketers
Emirati women cricketers
United Arab Emirates women Twenty20 International cricketers
English expatriates in the United Arab Emirates
British sportspeople of Indian descent
English people of Indian descent
British Asian cricketers
Manchester Originals cricketers